The Regulatory Authority for Energy (RAE or ΡΑΕ from Ρυθμιστική Αρχή Ενέργειας in Greek) is an independent administrative authority, which was established in order to implement the provisions of Directive 96/92/EC for the liberalization of the electricity market in Greece.

RAE is a member of the Council of European Energy Regulators.

See also

 Energy in Greece

References

External links

Energy in Greece
Energy regulatory authorities
Regulation in Greece